Veselin Đuretić (Serbian Cyrillic: Веселин Ђуретић; 17 May 1933 – 18 February 2020) was a Yugoslav and Serbian historian.

Early life 
Đuretić was born on 17 May 1933 in the village of Mojanovići near Podgorica, Zeta Banovina, Kingdom of Yugoslavia (modern-day Montenegro). He was associate of Balkan Institute of the Serbian Academy of Science and Arts and one of founders of the Academy of Sciences and Arts of the Republika Srpska (SANU). During 1990's Đuretić was close to Serbian Radical Party and member of the International Committee for the Truth About Radovan Karadžić. In 2012 he was a candidate for member of the Serbian academy.

Allies and War Drama 
The book authored by Đuretić in 1985 titled "Saveznici i ratna drama"() was first book which rehabilitate Chetniks published in post-war Socialistic Yugoslavia. The effect of this book was compared to the earthquake while rehabilitation of Chetniks it contained was received with big attention among Serbs. Because this work opened taboo topic from the World War II, it was perceived by Yugoslav Peoples Army as an attack to the basic foundations of the communist revolution and its Admiral Branko Mamula publicly condemned Đuretić and its publisher Serbian Academy of Science and Arts In this book Đuretić consistently emphasized that Chetniks of Draža Mihailović were antifascists, persistently rejecting any existence of Greater-Serbian hegemony or ethnicity based exploitation insuring the Kingdom of Yugoslavia.

Reactions 
Egbert Jahn emphasized that before Đuretić published this work the Yugoslav communist influenced historiography promoted a misrepresented image of Chetniks depicted only as "collaborators and traitors". Jahn further underlined that Đuretić's work was a long overdue change of this misrepresented image of Chetniks and also a complete reinterpretation of the recent history of Serbs.

According to some sources, Đuretić invested his substantial capabilities to try to fulfill Greater Serbian political ideology. The Serbian Supreme Court confirmed the first level court decision to ban the distribution of all three editions of Đuretić's work.

Death
Đuretić died on 18 February 2020 in Belgrade. He is interred at the New Bežanija Cemetery.

Bibliography

References

Sources 

 
 
  

1933 births
2020 deaths
Writers from Podgorica
Serbs of Montenegro
Yugoslav historians
20th-century Serbian historians